State Highway 89 (SH 89) is a state highway in San Patricio County in the U.S. state of Texas. The route serves as a bypass of Sinton to the northeast, connecting to U.S. Route 181 (US 181) at both ends.

Route description
The southern terminus of SH 89 is an at-grade intersection with US 181 and SH 188; northbound US 181 turns to the west, cosigned with westbound SH 188, toward downtown Sinton, and eastbound SH 188 continues toward Aransas County. After crossing Chiltipin Creek, the route turns toward the northwest and has a partial interchange with US 77 Business before meeting the frontage roads of mainline US 77 (Future I-69E). Past this intersection, SH 89 curves toward the west before reaching its northern terminus at an exit for southbound US 181 traffic; the expressway continues past this point as US 181 northbound toward Beeville.

SH 89 is a hurricane evacuation route.

History
SH 89 was designated on February 24, 1988, with construction beginning in May 2006. Construction was completed on the northbound lanes in September 2008, with the southbound lanes opening on January 5, 2009. The construction of the roadway included ten bridges and two new drainage structures near the north end.

Previous routes
 SH 89 was originally defined on August 21, 1923 as a route from Burleson to Meridian, replacing a portion of SH 2. On March 19, 1930, this route was cancelled, and SH 89 was redesignated along a route from Weatherford to Strawn (unnumbered before that). On November 30, 1932, SH 89 was extended north to Gainesville, overtaking SH 169. On July 15, 1935, the section from Weatherford to Gainesville was cancelled. On October 23, 1935, the section from Gainesville to Weatherford was restored. The section from Strawn and Weatherford was transferred to US 80/SH 1 (did not take effect until this part of SH 89 was surfaced). Portions of the route had been built by 1938, but the route was cancelled by September 26, 1939.

Major intersections

References

External links

089
Transportation in San Patricio County, Texas